is a fictional character and the protagonist in the racing video game series F-Zero by Nintendo. Within the series, he is a mysterious racer who is among the best on the circuit, as well as a renowned bounty hunter. A different version of the character serves as the protagonist of the F-Zero: GP Legend anime series.

In addition to appearances in spin-offs in the F-Zero series, he has appeared in other Nintendo properties, such as the Super Smash Bros. series of crossover fighting games. Despite the dormancy of the F-Zero series, Falcon remains one of the most recognizable and well-received Nintendo characters. He has received mostly positive reviews from critics, especially for his appearance in Super Smash Bros.

Creation and characteristics
Being apparently inspired by Speed Racer, Max Rockatansky, and mainly Judge Dredd; Nintendo originally meant Captain Falcon to be the flagship character of the Super Nintendo Entertainment System, but this never panned out and Falcon was rarely seen nor recognized in Nintendo media compared to Star Fox's Fox McCloud.
He is described as an accomplished F-Zero pilot and renowned bounty hunter. In F-Zero X, it is rumored that his title of Captain came about because he was once an officer on the Internova Police Force. By the age of 36, Captain Falcon had built a reputation as one of the best bounty hunters in the galaxy, one that has earned him many enemies. This constant danger forces him to live in a sanctuary on a chain of islands off the coast of Port Town, where he spends most of his time. His desire for solitude is such that even after winning a race, he takes his award and quickly dashes to his home. Each of his home islands contains a different racetrack, allowing him to keep his racing skills at their peak while remaining relatively safe. In 2017, an interview with Akinori Sao F-Zero artist Takaya Imamura revealed that Captain Falcon was almost the ambassador of the SNES. "Captain Falcon was originally the mascot character for Super NES. Even most people at Nintendo don't know that. When development of F-ZERO was almost complete, I was doing a bunch of illustrations and someone expressed a desire to make a mascot character for Super NES, with a name like Captain Something. So I started thinking about a character who would match the colors of the Super Famicom controller, with some red and blue and yellow."

In Super Smash Bros., In reference to his home series of racing games, Captain Falcon was initially designed to be the fastest character in the series, though his speed was eventually surpassed in Brawl, by that of Sonic the Hedgehog. Throughout the series, Captain Falcon's fighting style has consisted of a blend between martial arts and street fighting; although he lacks any form of long-range projectile attacks, his quick movement speed lets him dash around the battlefield, while his attacks are far more powerful than those of other characters with his speed. The "Falcon Punch", his signature attack and his most iconic phrase, involves a forceful punch accompanied by a large flame in the shape of a falcon surrounding his fist; while the attack has a long wind-up (which allows opponents plenty of time to evade), it lands with devastating force. The attack's exaggerated execution and extreme power has resulted in it becoming a popular internet meme, which in turn saw it implemented in the F-Zero: GP Legend anime series. Another meme to come from Falcon's involvement in Super Smash Bros. is one of his taunts, where he salutes and says "Show me your moves!" to his opponent. His Final Smash summons his racer, the Blue Falcon, which crashes into the opponents.

Appearances

In F-Zero series
Captain Falcon is the de facto mascot of the F-Zero series, appearing in most material alongside his signature vehicle, the Blue Falcon. Captain Falcon first appeared in the titular game in the series, F-Zero and in its sequel F-Zero X. After these appearances, Falcon does not appear again until F-Zero GX.

The character drives the Blue Falcon in his races and uses a sidearm and a midsize spacecraft called the Falcon Flyer for bounty missions. In F-Zero X, Captain Falcon's DNA is stolen while he is hospitalized following an accident in the F-Zero Grand Prix. The thieves use the DNA to create a clone of Captain Falcon known as Blood Falcon.

Falcon is the hero of F-Zero GX, the fifth game in the series. He is 37 years old and the sitting champion of the F-Zero Grand Prix, boosting his already high popularity even higher. In the games' story mode, after winning a number of races and saving Jody Summer, he goes on to defeat Black Shadow and Deathborn. In F-Zero: Maximum Velocity, which is set twenty-five years after the first game, Kent Akechi claims to be the son of Captain Falcon.

He has also appeared in other games like Super Smash as a playable character.

In other media
Outside of the F-Zero series. Captain Falcon has appeared as a playable character beginning with the first game, Super Smash Bros., Super Smash Bros. Melee, Super Smash Bros. Brawl, Super Smash Bros. for Nintendo 3DS and Wii U and Super Smash Bros. Ultimate. In Mario Kart 8, Captain Falcon appears on billboards which can be seen in the background throughout the Mute City stage. An unlockable Captain Falcon Mii costume is also featured in the game. In the F-Zero: GP Legend media continuity, Captain Falcon is a title given to a person instead of an individual's actual name.

Reception

Captain Falcon is one of Nintendo's most popular characters in the Super Smash Bros. series. Nintendo Power listed Captain Falcon as their 20th favorite hero, jokingly commenting that he is kind of a jerk, citing his massacre of Pikmin in Super Smash Bros. Brawl. They added that this is what makes them like him. GamePro claims that Captain Falcon demonstrates "clear superiority" over other F-Zero characters. Seth Walker, Game Boy Advance editor for Kombo, has stated that he would like to see storylines with greater focus on Captain Falcon in the F-Zero series. IGN noted that Captain Falcon moveset of Super Smash Bros. Brawl were similar to Super Smash Bros. Melee, and praising its new Final Smash. Liam Wiseman of IGN also described Captain Falcon as a Nintendo icon, despite of not having a F-Zero game released in 17 years, while Chris Carter of Destructoid described Captain Falcon as a "fighting game meme". Chris Morgan for Yardbarker described Captain Falcon as one of "the most memorable characters from old school Nintendo games".

GameDaily named Captain Falcon as the 25th top Nintendo character of all time. NerdMentality referred to Captain Falcon as "the only known last legitimate use of the word 'extreme'". UGO Networks remarked that Captain Falcon is "cool" for his speed and for driving "a freakin' hovercar". However, they criticized his habit of shouting out the name of his Falcon Punch before he actually hits it. Wired.com's Chris Kohler claimed he greatly enjoyed playing with Captain Falcon in Super Smash Bros. Brawl. IGN has called Captain Falcon an experienced fighter, and "one of the most important and recognizable characters" from the F-Zero and Super Smash Bros. franchises. They went on to say that Falcon appears always ready to give a "butt-kicking to anyone that comes his way". Jeremy Parish of Polygon ranked 73 fighters from Super Smash Bros. Ultimate "from garbage to glorious", listing Captain Falcon as 68th, criticized and stated that “FALCON PUUUNCH” memes were funny for a while, but that’s not precisely compelling character development, you know?" while Gavin Jasper of Den of Geek ranked Captain Falcon as second of Super Smash Bros. Ultimate characters, praising it and stated that Captain Falcon "is so lovable and so defining to the Smash series."

References

External links

 Captain Falcon fansite

Action video game characters
Fictional aviators
Fictional bounty hunters
Fictional police officers in video games 
Internet memes
Video game memes
Fictional racing drivers
Fictional mixed martial artists
F-Zero
Male characters in video games
Nintendo protagonists
Nintendo characters
Science fiction video game characters
Super Smash Bros. fighters
Video game characters introduced in 1990
Video game characters who can move at superhuman speeds
Video game characters with superhuman strength
Video game mascots
Vigilante characters in video games

simple:List of F-Zero characters#Captain Falcon